Kaşif (literally: "Explorer") is a Turkish remotely operated underwater vehicle (ROUV) developed to perform various tasks at underwater drilling works during gas exploration.

She has seven electric motors for propulsion and a hydraulic power system for driving drawers.

Kaşif was developed and constructed  by Armelsan in Turkey in 2020, and was first used at underwater drilling works of Fatih during gas exploration in Black Sea.

References

Remotely operated underwater vehicles
Robotic submarines
Ships built in Istanbul
Ships of Turkey
2020 ships
Robots of Turkey